Below are the results of the 2021 World Series of Poker, being held from September 30-November 23 at the Rio All-Suite Hotel and Casino in Las Vegas, Nevada.

Key

Results
Source:

Event #1: $500 Casino Employees No-Limit Hold'em

 2-Day Event: September 30-October 1
 Number of Entries: 419
 Total Prize Pool: $175,980
 Number of Payouts: 63
 Winning Hand:

Event #2 $25,000 H.O.R.S.E.

 3-Day Event: September 30-October 2
 Number of Entries: 78
 Total Prize Pool: $1,842,750
 Number of Payouts: 12
 Winning Hand:  (Seven Card Stud)

Event #3: $1,000 Covid-19 Relief No-Limit Hold'em

 2-Day Event: September 30-October 1
 Number of Entries: 260
 Total Prize Pool: $231,400
 Number of Payouts: 39
 Winning Hand:

Event #4: $500 The Reunion No-Limit Hold'em

 5-Day Event: October 1-5
 Number of Entries:  12,973
 Total Prize Pool:  $5,448,660
 Number of Payouts:  639
 Winning Hand:

Event #5: $1,500 Omaha Hi-Lo 8 or Better

 3-Day Event: October 1-3
 Number of Entries: 607
 Total Prize Pool: $910,500
 Number of Payouts: 92
 Winning Hand:

Event #6: $25,000 High Roller No-Limit Hold'em 8-Handed

 3-Day Event: October 2-4
 Number of Entries:  135
 Total Prize Pool:  $3,189,375
 Number of Payouts:  21
 Winning Hand:

Event #7: $1,500 Dealers Choice 6-Handed

 3-Day Event: October 3-5
 Number of Entries:  307
 Total Prize Pool:  $409,845
 Number of Payouts:  47
 Winning Hand: (Pot-Limit Omaha)

Event #8: $600 No-Limit Hold'em Deepstack

 2-Day Event: October 4-5
 Number of Entries:  4,527
 Total Prize Pool:  $2,308,770
 Number of Payouts:  680
 Winning Hand:

Event #9: $10,000 Omaha Hi-Lo 8 or Better Championship

 4-Day Event: October 4-7
 Number of Entries:  134
 Total Prize Pool:  $1,249,550
 Number of Payouts:  21
 Winning Hand:

Event #10: $1,000 Super Turbo Bounty No-Limit Hold'em

 1-Day Event: October 5
 Number of Entries:  1,640
 Total Prize Pool:  $1,459,600
 Number of Payouts:  246
 Winning Hand:

Event #11: $25,000 Heads-Up No-Limit Hold'em Championship

 3-Day Event: October 5-7
 Number of Entries:  57
 Total Prize Pool:  $1,346,625
 Number of Payouts:  8
 Winning Hand:

Event #12: $1,500 Limit Hold'em

 3-Day Event: October 5-7
 Number of Entries:  422
 Total Prize Pool:  $563,370
 Number of Payouts:  64
 Winning Hand:

Event #13: $3,000 No-Limit Hold'em Freezeout

 3-Day Event: October 6-8
 Number of Entries:  720
 Total Prize Pool:  $1,922,400
 Number of Payouts:  108
 Winning Hand:

Event #14: $1,500 Seven Card Stud

 3-Day Event: October 6-8
 Number of Entries:  261
 Total Prize Pool:  $348,435
 Number of Payouts:  39
 Winning Hand:  /  /

Event #15: $1,500 No-Limit Hold'em 6-Handed

 3-Day Event: October 7-9
 Number of Entries:  1,450
 Total Prize Pool:  $1,935,750
 Number of Payouts:  218
 Winning Hand:

Event #16: $10,000 Limit Hold'em Championship

 3-Day Event: October 7-9
 Number of Entries:  92
 Total Prize Pool:  $857,900
 Number of Payouts:  14
 Winning Hand:

Event #17: $1,500 Millionaire Maker No-Limit Hold'em

 5-Day Event: October 8-12
 Number of Entries:  2,568
 Total Prize Pool:  $3,428,280
 Number of Payouts:  799
 Winning Hand:

Event #18: $2,500 Mixed Triple Draw Lowball

 3-Day Event: October 8-10
 Number of Entries:  253
 Total Prize Pool:  $562,925
 Number of Payouts:  38
 Winning Hand:  (2-7 Triple Draw)

Event #19: $10,000 Seven Card Stud Championship 

 3-Day Event: October 9-11
 Number of Entries:  62
 Total Prize Pool:  $578,150
 Number of Payouts:  10
 Winning Hand:  /  /

Event #20: $1,000 Flip & Go No-Limit Hold'em 

 2-Day Event: October 10-11
 Number of Entries:  1,240
 Total Prize Pool:  $1,103,600
 Number of Payouts:  155
 Winning Hand:

Event #21: $1,500 Mixed Omaha Hi-Lo 

 3-Day Event: October 10-12
 Number of Entries:  641
 Total Prize Pool:  $855,735
 Number of Payouts:  96
 Winning Hand:  (Big O)

Event #22: $10,000/$1,000 Ladies No-Limit Hold'em Championship 

 4-Day Event: October 11-14
 Number of Entries:  644
 Total Prize Pool:  $573,160
 Number of Payouts: 97
 Winning Hand:

Event #23: $1,500 Eight Game Mix 

 3-Day Event: October 11-13
 Number of Entries:  484
 Total Prize Pool:  $646,140
 Number of Payouts:  73
 Winning Hand:  (2-7 Triple Draw)

Event #24: $600 Pot-Limit Omaha Deepstack 

 2-Day Event: October 12-13
 Number of Entries:  1,572
 Total Prize Pool:  $801,720
 Number of Payouts:  236
 Winning Hand:

Event #25: $5,000 No-Limit Hold'em 6-Handed 

 4-Day Event: October 12-15
 Number of Entries:  604
 Total Prize Pool:  $2,666,025
 Number of Payouts:  91
 Winning Hand:

Event #26: $1,000 Freezeout No-Limit Hold'em 

 2-Day Event: October 13-14
 Number of Entries:  1,358
 Total Prize Pool:  $1,208,620
 Number of Payouts:  204
 Winning Hand:

Event #27: $1,500 H.O.R.S.E. 

 3-Day Event: October 13-15
 Number of Entries:  594
 Total Prize Pool:  $792,990
 Number of Payouts:  90
 Winning Hand:  /  /  (Razz)

Event #28: $1,000 Pot-Limit Omaha 8-Handed 

 3-Day Event: October 14-16
 Number of Entries: 1,069
 Total Prize Pool: $951,410
 Number of Payouts: 161
 Winning Hand:

Event #29: $10,000 Short Deck No-Limit Hold'em 

 3-Day Event: October 14-16
 Number of Entries: 66
 Total Prize Pool: $615,450
 Number of Payouts: 10
 Winning Hand:

Event #30: $1,500 Monster Stack No-Limit Hold'em 

 5-Day Event: October 15-19
 Number of Entries: 3,520
 Total Prize Pool: $4,699,200
 Number of Payouts: 528
 Winning Hand:

Event #31: $1,500 No-Limit 2-7 Lowball Draw 

 3-Day Event: October 15-17
 Number of Entries: 272
 Total Prize Pool: $363,120
 Number of Payouts: 41
 Winning Hand:

Event #32: $3,000 H.O.R.S.E. 

 3-Day Event: October 16-18
 Number of Entries: 282
 Total Prize Pool: $752,940
 Number of Payouts: 43
 Winning Hand:  /  /  (Razz)

Event #33: $800 No-Limit Hold'em Deepstack 

 3-Day Event: October 17-19
 Number of Entries:  2,778
 Total Prize Pool:  $1,955,712
 Number of Payouts:  417
 Winning Hand:

Event #34: $1,500 Limit 2-7 Lowball Triple Draw 

 3-Day Event: October 17-19
 Number of Entries:  284
 Total Prize Pool:  $380,475
 Number of Payouts:  43
 Winning Hand:

Event #35: $500 Freezeout No-Limit Hold'em 

 2-Day Event: October 18-19
 Number of Entries:  2,930
 Total Prize Pool:  $1,231,020
 Number of Payouts:  440
 Winning Hand:

Event #36: $10,000 Dealers Choice 6-Handed Championship 

 3-Day Event: October 18-20
 Number of Entries:  93
 Total Prize Pool:  $867,225
 Number of Payouts:  14
 Winning Hand:  (Badugi)

Event #37: $1,500 Super Turbo Bounty No Limit Hold'em 

 1-Day Event: October 19
 Number of Entries:  1,441
 Total Prize Pool:  $1,923,735
 Number of Payouts:  217
 Winning Hand:

Event #38: $50,000 High Roller No-Limit Hold'em 8-Handed 

 3-Day Event: October 19-21
 Number of Entries:  81
 Total Prize Pool:  $3,877,875
 Number of Payouts:  13
 Winning Hand:

Event #39: $1,500 Pot-Limit Omaha 8-Handed 

 3-Day Event: October 20-22
 Number of Entries:  821
 Total Prize Pool:  $1,096,035
 Number of Payouts:  124
 Winning Hand:

Event #40: $10,000 H.O.R.S.E. Championship 

 4-Day Event: October 20-23
 Number of Entries:  149
 Total Prize Pool:  $1,389,425
 Number of Payouts:  23
 Winning Hand:  (Omaha Hi-Lo)

Event #41: $2,500 Freezeout No-Limit Hold'em 

 3-Day Event: October 21-23
 Number of Entries:  896
 Total Prize Pool:  $1,993,600
 Number of Payouts:  135
 Winning Hand:

Event #42: $1,500 Razz 

 3-Day Event: October 21-23
 Number of Entries:  311
 Total Prize Pool:  $415,185
 Number of Payouts:  47
 Winning Hand:  /  /

Event #43: $1,000 Double Stack No-Limit Hold'em 

 5-Day Event: October 22-26
 Number of Entries:  3,991
 Total Prize Pool:  $3,551,990
 Number of Payouts:  599
 Winning Hand:

Event #44: $3,000 Limit Hold'em 6-Handed 

 3-Day Event: October 22-24
 Number of Entries:  162
 Total Prize Pool:  $432,540
 Number of Payouts:  25
 Winning Hand:

Event #45: $10,000 Pot-Limit Omaha 8-Handed Championship 

 4-Day Event: October 23-26
 Number of Entries:  344
 Total Prize Pool:  $3,207,800
 Number of Payouts:  52
 Winning Hand:

Event #46: $800 No-Limit Hold'em Deepstack 

 2-Day Event: October 24-25
 Number of Entries:  2,053
 Total Prize Pool:  $1,445,312
 Number of Payouts:  308
 Winning Hand:

Event #47: $5,000 Freezeout No-Limit Hold'em 8-Handed 

 3-Day Event: October 24-26
 Number of Entries:  421
 Total Prize Pool:  $1,941,863
 Number of Payouts:  64
 Winning Hand:

Event #48: $1,500 Shootout No-Limit Hold'em 

 3-Day Event: October 25-27
 Number of Entries:  800
 Total Prize Pool:  $1,068,000
 Number of Payouts:  80
 Winning Hand:

Event #49: $10,000 No-Limit 2-7 Lowball Draw Championship 

 3-Day Event: October 25-27
 Number of Entries:  122
 Total Prize Pool:  $1,137,000
 Number of Payouts:  19
 Winning Hand:

Event #50: $600 Mixed No-Limit Hold'em/Pot-Limit Omaha Deepstack 8-Handed 

 2-Day Event: October 26-27
 Number of Entries:  1,569
 Total Prize Pool:  $800,190
 Number of Payouts:  236
 Winning Hand:

Event #51: $3,000 No-Limit Hold'em 6-Handed 

 2-Day Event: October 26-27
 Number of Entries:  997
 Total Prize Pool:  $2,661,990
 Number of Payouts:  150
 Winning Hand:

Event #52: $1,000 Seniors No-Limit Hold'em Championship 

 4-Day Event: October 27-November 1
 Number of Entries:  5,404
 Total Prize Pool:  $4,809,560
 Number of Payouts:  811
 Winning Hand:

Event #53: $25,000 High Roller Pot-Limit Omaha 

 4-Day Event: October 27-30
 Number of Entries:  212
 Total Prize Pool:  $5,008,500
 Number of Payouts:  32
 Winning Hand:

Event #54: $2,500 Nine Game Mix 6-Handed 

 3-Day Event: October 28-31
 Number of Entries:  319
 Total Prize Pool:  $709,775
 Number of Payouts:  48
 Winning Hand:  /  /  (Razz)

Event #55: $400 Colossus No-Limit Hold'em 

 4-Day Event: October 29-November 1
 Number of Entries:  9,399
 Total Prize Pool:  $3,101,670
 Number of Payouts:  1,391
 Winning Hand:

Event #56: $10,000 No-Limit Hold'em 6-Handed Championship 

 3-Day Event: October 29-31
 Number of Entries:  329
 Total Prize Pool:  $3,067,925
 Number of Payouts:  50
 Winning Hand:

Event #57: $10,000 Limit 2-7 Lowball Triple Draw Championship 

 3-Day Event: October 30-November 1
 Number of Entries:  80
 Total Prize Pool:  $746,000
 Number of Payouts:  14
 Winning Hand:

Event #58: $1,000 Super Seniors No-Limit Hold'em 

 4-Day Event: October 31-November 3
 Number of Entries:  1,893
 Total Prize Pool:  $1,684,770
 Number of Payouts:  284
 Winning Hand:

Event #59: $1,000 Tag Team No-Limit Hold'em 

 3-Day Event: October 31-November 2
 Number of Entries:  641
 Total Prize Pool:  $285,245
 Number of Payouts:  97
 Winning Hand:

Event #60: $50,000 Poker Players Championship 

 5-Day Event: October 31-November 4
 Number of Entries:  63
 Total Prize Pool:  $3,016,125
 Number of Payouts:  10
 Winning Hand:  (Limit Hold'em)

Event #61: $600 Deepstack Championship No-Limit Hold'em 

 3-Day Event: November 1-3
 Number of Entries:  3,916
 Total Prize Pool:  $1,997,160
 Number of Payouts:  588
 Winning Hand:

Event #62: $1,500 Pot-Limit Omaha Hi-Lo 8 or Better 

 3-Day Event: November 1-3
 Number of Entries:  725
 Total Prize Pool:  $967,875
 Number of Payouts:  109
 Winning Hand:

Event #63: $500 Salute to Warriors No-Limit Hold'em 

 3-Day Event: November 2-4
 Number of Entries:  1,738
 Total Prize Pool:  $782,100
 Number of Payouts:  261
 Winning Hand:

Event #64: $5,000 Mixed No-Limit Hold'em/Pot-Limit Omaha 

 2-Day Event: November 2-3
 Number of Entries:  579
 Total Prize Pool:  $2,670,638
 Number of Payouts:  87
 Winning Hand:

Event #65: $1,000 Mini Main Event No-Limit Hold'em 

 3-Day Event: November 3-5
 Number of Entries:  3,821
 Total Prize Pool:  $3,400,690
 Number of Payouts:  574
 Winning Hand:

Event #66: $10,000 Pot-Limit Omaha Hi-Lo 8 or Better Championship 

 4-Day Event: November 3-6
 Number of Entries:  194
 Total Prize Pool:  $1,809,050
 Number of Payouts:  32
 Winning Hand:

Event #67: $10,000 No-Limit Hold'em Main Event 

 9-Day Event: November 4-19
 Number of Entries:  6,650
 Total Prize Pool:  $62,011,250
 Number of Payouts:  1,000
 Winning Hand:

Event #68: $1,111 Little One for One Drop No-Limit Hold'em 

 5-Day Event: November 8-12
 Number of Entries:  3,797
 Total Prize Pool:  $3,800,797
 Number of Payouts:  570
 Winning Hand:

Event #69: $1,500 Seven Card Stud Hi-Lo 8 or Better  

 3-Day Event: November 10-12
 Number of Entries:  372
 Total Prize Pool:  $496,620
 Number of Payouts:  56
 Winning Hand:  /

Event #70: $888 Crazy Eights No-Limit Hold'em  

 6-Day Event: November 11-16
 Number of Entries:  5,262
 Total Prize Pool:  $4,150,761
 Number of Payouts:  735
 Winning Hand:

Event #71: $1,500 Bounty Pot-Limit Omaha 8-Handed  

 3-Day Event: November 11-13
 Number of Entries:  860
 Total Prize Pool:  $1,148,100
 Number of Payouts:  129
 Winning Hand:

Event #72: $1,500 Mixed No-Limit Hold'em/Pot-Limit Omaha  

 3-Day Event: November 12-14
 Number of Entries:  846
 Total Prize Pool:  $1,129,410
 Number of Payouts:  127
 Winning Hand:  (Pot-Limit Omaha)

Event #73: $10,000 Seven Card Stud Hi-Lo 8 or Better Championship  

 3-Day Event: November 13-15
 Number of Entries:  144
 Total Prize Pool:  $1,342,800
 Number of Payouts:  22
 Winning Hand:  /  /

Event #74: $2,500 Mixed Big Bet Event  

 3-Day Event: November 14-16
 Number of Entries:  212
 Total Prize Pool:  $471,700
 Number of Payouts:  32
 Winning Hand:  (Pot-Limit Omaha 8-or-Better)

Event #75: $1,500 Freezeout No-Limit Hold'em  

 3-Day Event: November 15-17
 Number of Entries:  1,191
 Total Prize Pool:  $1,589,985
 Number of Payouts:  177
 Winning Hand:

Event #76: $10,000 Super Turbo Bounty No-Limit Hold'em  

 2-Day Event: November 15-16
 Number of Entries:  307
 Total Prize Pool:  $2,862,775
 Number of Payouts:  47
 Winning Hand:

Event #77: $1,500 Fifty Stack No-Limit Hold'em  

 2-Day Event: November 16-17
 Number of Entries:  1,501
 Total Prize Pool:  $2,003,835
 Number of Payouts:  226
 Winning Hand:

Event #78: $10,000 Razz Championship  

 3-Day Event: November 16-18
 Number of Entries:  109
 Total Prize Pool:  $1,016,425
 Number of Payouts:  17
 Winning Hand:  /  /

Event #79: $1,979 Poker Hall of Fame Bounty No-Limit Hold'em  

 3-Day Event: November 17-19
 Number of Entries:  468
 Total Prize Pool:  $826,050
 Number of Payouts:  71
 Winning Hand:

Event #80: $3,000 Pot-Limit Omaha 6-Handed  

 4-Day Event: November 17-20
 Number of Entries:  496
 Total Prize Pool:  $1,324,320
 Number of Payouts:  74
 Winning Hand:

Event #81: $800 No Limit Hold'em Deepstack  

 2-Day Event: November 18-19
 Number of Entries:  1,921
 Total Prize Pool:  $1,352,384
 Number of Payouts:  289
 Winning Hand:

Event #82: $250,000 Super High Roller No-Limit Hold'em  

 3-Day Event: November 18-20
 Number of Entries:  33
 Total Prize Pool:  $8,217,000
 Number of Payouts:  5
 Winning Hand:

Event #83: $1,500 The Closer No-Limit Hold'em  

 3-Day Event: November 19-21
 Number of Entries:  1,903
 Total Prize Pool:  $2,540,505
 Number of Payouts:  274
 Winning Hand:

Event #84: $50,000 High Roller Pot-Limit Omaha  

 2-Day Event: November 19-20
 Number of Entries:  85
 Total Prize Pool:  $4,069,375
 Number of Payouts:  13
 Winning Hand:

Event #85: $50,000 High Roller No-Limit Hold'em  

 3-Day Event: November 20-22
 Number of Entries:  113
 Total Prize Pool:  $5,409,875
 Number of Payouts:  17
 Winning Hand:

Event #86: $1,000 Super Turbo No Limit Hold'em  

 1-Day Event: November 21
 Number of Entries:  1,025
 Total Prize Pool:  $912,250
 Number of Payouts:  154
 Winning Hand:

Event #87: $100,000 High Roller No-Limit Hold'em  

 3-Day Event: November 21-23
 Number of Entries:  64
 Total Prize Pool:  $6,192,000
 Number of Payouts:  10
 Winning Hand:

Event #88: $5,000 No-Limit Hold'em 8-Handed  

 2-Day Event: November 22-23
 Number of Entries:  531
 Total Prize Pool:  $2,449,238
 Number of Payouts:  80
 Winning Hand:

References

External links
Official website
PokerNews coverage

World Series of Poker
World Series of Poker Results, 2021